The 1935 East Tennessee State Teachers Buccaneers football team was an American football team that represented State Teachers College, Johnson City—now known as East Tennessee State University (ETSU)—as a member of the Smoky Mountain Conference in the 1935 college football season. They were led by fourth-year head coach Gene McMurray. The 1935 team marks the first time the football team was called the Buccaneers, which McMurray is credited with coining.

Schedule

References

East Tennessee State Teachers
East Tennessee State Buccaneers football seasons
East Tennessee State Teachers Buccaneers football